Suess Glacier is a glacier between Canada Glacier and Lacroix Glacier, flowing south into Taylor Valley in Victoria Land, Antarctica. It was charted and named by the British Antarctic Expedition under Scott, 1910–13, for Professor Eduard Suess, noted Austrian geologist and paleontologist.

Glaciers of McMurdo Dry Valleys